Benjamin Ebrahimzadeh (born 3 January 1980 in Saarbrücken) is Iranian-German tennis player who competed for the Iran Davis Cup team in 2008. Currently, he is the coach of Cedrik-Marcel Stebe and Natalia Vikhlyantseva. He was the coach of Angelique Kerber between 2012 and February 2015.

References

External links

 
 
 

German tennis coaches
German people of Iranian descent
Iranian male tennis players
Sportspeople from Saarbrücken
Living people
1980 births
Angelique Kerber